János Árgyelán (born 26 January 1969) is a retired Hungarian football midfielder.

References

1965 births
Living people
Hungarian footballers
Békéscsaba 1912 Előre footballers
Győri ETO FC players
FC Sopron players
Budapest Honvéd FC players
Fehérvár FC players
Újpest FC players
Association football midfielders